The Nabu Museum is a museum in  El-Heri, in Ras Al Shaqa’, Lebanon.

It opened in 2018, having been built in just eight months by businessman Jawad Adra to house his collection of about 2,000 items including both contemporary works of art and antiquities. Critical questions came up about the unclear provenance of the finds displayed in the museum, as many of them come from regions where looting was going on in recent decades 

The building was designed by Iraqi sculptor Dia Azzawi and Iraqi-Canadian artist Mahmoud Obaidi.

References

External links

Art museums and galleries in Lebanon
Museums established in 2018